The 1997 London Monarchs season was the fifth season for the franchise in the World League of American Football (WLAF). The team was led by head coach Lionel Taylor in his second year, and played its home games at Stamford Bridge in London, England. They finished the regular season in sixth place with a record of four wins and six losses.

Offseason

World League draft

Personnel

Staff

Roster

Schedule

Standings

Game summaries

Week 1: vs Frankfurt Galaxy

Week 2: at Rhein Fire

Week 3: at Amsterdam Admirals

Week 7: at Frankfurt Galaxy

Week 8: vs Amsterdam Admirals

Week 10: vs Rhein Fire

Awards
After the completion of the regular season, the All-World League team was selected by members of the media. Overall, London had two players selected. The selections were:

 Richard Newbill, linebacker
 Malcolm Showell, defensive end

Notes

References

London Monarchs seasons